Plymstock School is a state comprehensive secondary school (ages 11–19) in Plymstock, a suburb of Plymouth, Devon, England. It was the first West Devon comprehensive school (built on the core of a post war secondary school) and is now a Specialist Sports College.  it has 1,626 students, of whom 240 are in the sixth form. In April 2011, the school became an academy.

Plymstock School was maintained by Devon County Council until 1 April 1967, when it was transferred to Plymouth City Council which has maintained it until April 2011. In 2003 it underwent what was reported as a budget crisis, forcing redundancies and reduced spending on new classrooms to replace temporary facilities.

Many of the latest school ratings, in local and national newspapers, have placed Plymstock in the top 5 of Plymouth schools, with the higher ranked schools being selective or fee-paying schools, and within the top 800 of England. (Herald, The Independent). As of the 2009, OFSTED report, this school has been rated as 'Outstanding'.

Plymstock's local feeder primary schools include: Elburton Primary; Hooe Primary; Dunstone Primary; Pomphlett Primary; and Oreston Primary.

History
The school was opened on 26 April 1911 as the Plymstock Senior Mixed School, and replaced the Dean Cross Elementary School for Boys. The first headmaster was T. F. Jarvis. Its name was changed to Plymstock County Senior Mixed School, and then to Plymstock County Secondary School, and in September 1961 to its current name. In 1965, it became a comprehensive school, and the buildings were extended between 1969 and 1970 to accommodate a further 300 pupils.

On 4 April 2006, the school achieved a Guinness World Record for "Most people playing parachute" when 1,547 children played with 58 parachutes at the same time. The world record stood until 30 June 2011, when it was beaten by children from the Gaza Strip with 3520 people.

Notable former pupils

 Keith Blount - Royal Navy admiral and pilot
 Sharron Davies – Olympic swimmer and television presenter
 Chris Dawson (born 1952), billionaire businessman, founder and owner of The Range
 Antony Jinman – polar explorer
 Heather Knight – cricketer
 Liz White – actress, Life on Mars and Vera Drake
 Jon Iles – Actor, The Bill 1984–1992
 Steven Bartlett - businessman, entrepreneur and television personality

References

 "It's a model school in every way bar one ... the money's just not there" Education The Guardian, Friday 18 July 2003

External links
 

Academies in Plymouth, Devon
Educational institutions established in 1911
Secondary schools in Plymouth, Devon
1911 establishments in England